The 2019 AFF Women's Championship was the 11th edition of the AFF Women's Championship, an international women's football tournament organised by the ASEAN Football Federation (AFF). The tournament was hosted by Thailand from 15 to 27 August 2019.

Vietnam ended Thailand's dominance in the last three editions of the tournament by winning 1–0 in the final. This is Vietnam's third title in total and first title after 7 years. For the first time since 2012, Australia (or its under-20 team) did not participate in the championship.

Squads

Group stage 
All times listed are Thai Standard Time (UTC+07:00)

Group A

Group B

Knockout stage

Semi-finals

Third place match

Final

Awards

Goalscorers

Final ranking

See also
 2019 SAFF Women's Championship
 2019 EAFF E-1 Football Championship (women)

References

2019
International association football competitions hosted by Thailand
AFF Women's Championship
Aff Women's Championship
Aff Women's Championship
W